Goonoobah is a heritage-listed residence at 42 King Street, East Maitland, City of Maitland, New South Wales, Australia. It was added to the New South Wales State Heritage Register on 2 April 1999.

History 

Goonoobah was built between June 1841 and May 1842 for George Furber, the owner of the George and Dragon Hotel. A central hallway and main entrance for both Goonoobah and the conjoined and also-heritage listed Woodlands was built in 1896, before both buildings were converted into a complex of three flats in 1930.

Description

Goonoobah is one of two conjoined sandstone cottages in the Victorian Georgian style built on different alignments, with Woodlands set back further from the street. It has a large hipped iron roof and a bullnose verandah with cast-iron fence and columns; and French windows with shutters. There are three large stuccoed chimneys, two with pots.

Heritage listing 

Goonoobah was listed on the New South Wales State Heritage Register on 2 April 1999.

See also

References

Bibliography

Attribution 

New South Wales State Heritage Register
East Maitland, New South Wales
Houses in New South Wales
Articles incorporating text from the New South Wales State Heritage Register